Aaron Bauer's gecko (Gekko aaronbaueri) is a species of lizard in the family Gekkonidae. The species is endemic to Laos.

Etymology
The specific name, aaronbaueri, is in honor of American herpetologist .

Geographic range
G. aaronbaueri is found in Khammouane Province, Laos.

Habitat

Description
G. aaronbaueri is medium-sized for its genus.

References

Further reading
Tri NV, Thai PH, David P, Teynié A (2015). "Gekko aaronbaueri, a new gecko (Squamata: Gekkonidae) from central Laos". Zootaxa 3914 (2): 144–156. (Gekko aaronbaueri, new species).

Gekko
Reptiles described in 2015
Endemic fauna of Laos
Reptiles of Laos